Glyaden is the name of several rural localities in Russia:
Glyaden, Altai Krai, a selo in Glyadensky Selsoviet of Blagoveshchensky District of Altai Krai
Glyaden, Glyadensky Selsoviet, Nazarovsky District, Krasnoyarsk Krai, a settlement in Glyadensky Selsoviet of Nazarovsky District of Krasnoyarsk Krai
Glyaden, Krasnosopkinsky Selsoviet, Nazarovsky District, Krasnoyarsk Krai, a village in Krasnosopkinsky Selsoviet of Nazarovsky District of Krasnoyarsk Krai
Glyaden, Novosibirsk Oblast, a village in Moshkovsky District of Novosibirsk Oblast